Conospermum caeruleum, commonly known as blue brother, is a shrub in the family Proteaceae and is endemic to the south west of Western Australia. It is a prostrate shrub with small, dense heads of blue, rarely pink flowers and usually grows in heavy soils subject to flooding.

Description
The leaves have prominent veins and end abruptly in a sharp point.

Taxonomy
Conospermum caeruleum was first formally described in 1810 by Robert Brown and the description was published in Transactions of the Linnean Society of London from a specimen collected near "King George's Sound, west coast of New Holland". The specific epithet (caeruleum) is a Latin word meaning "sky-blue".

Six subspecies are recognised by the Australian Plant Census as at November 2020:
Conospermum caeruleum R.Br. subsp. caeruleum
Conospermum caeruleum subsp. contortum E. M. Benn.
Conospermum caeruleum subsp. debile Meisn. E.M. Benn.
Conospermum caeruleum subsp. marginatum Meisn. E.M. Benn.
Conospermum caeruleum subsp. oblanceolatum E. M. Benn.
Conospermum caeruleum subsp. spathulatum Benth. E.M. Benn.
[Note: Eleanor Marion Bennett (1942 - ) is an Australian botanist who worked at the Western Australian Herbarium from 1965 -70.]

Distribution and habitat
Conospermum caeruleum occurs from Busselton to east of Albany in the Avon Wheatbelt, Esperance, Geraldton Sandplains, Jarrah Forest, Mallee, Swan Coastal Plain and Warren biogeographical regions of Western Australia growing on sand, sandy peat, stony clay, laterite or granite in areas that are wet in winter.

Use in horticulture
Conospermum species, especially the Western Australian ones are difficult to cultivate.

Conservation status
Conospermum caeruleum is classified as "not threatened" by the Government of Western Australia Department of Parks and Wildlife.

Gallery

References

External links

Eudicots of Western Australia
caeruleum
Endemic flora of Western Australia
Taxa named by Robert Brown (botanist, born 1773)
Plants described in 1810